Alvin Tehupeiory (born 5 April 1995) is an Indonesian sprinter.

From Maluku, Tehupeiory broke the 20 year old national record of Irene Joseph for the 200m in 2019, and was selected by the Executive Board of the All-Indonesia Athletics Association to fill their quota of athletes for the delayed 2020 Tokyo Olympics. She joined Lalu Muhammad Zohri as part of the Indonesian team.

She has been a multiple national champion in sprinting events at 100m, 200m and 400m hurdles. She won bronze medal at the 2014 Asian Junior Athletics Championships in the 400m hurdles.

References

1995 births
Living people
Sportspeople from Maluku (province)
Indonesian female sprinters
Athletes (track and field) at the 2020 Summer Olympics
Olympic female sprinters
Olympic athletes of Indonesia
Athletes (track and field) at the 2018 Asian Games
Asian Games competitors for Indonesia
21st-century Indonesian women